Yusuf Biscaino, also Ahmad b. Abd Allah al-Hayti al-Maruni, was a Morisco in the service of the Moroccan Sultan Mulay Zidan.

He was sent as an ambassador to the Low Countries in 1610-11.

He met with Prince Maurice of Nassau who inquired to him about Islamic opinions on Jesus. He preferred not to answer on the spot, but later sent a letter to Maurice After returning to Marrakesh, Yusuf Biscaino sent the letter in Latin to Maurice in 1611, relying as a source on the work of Muhammad Alguazir.

See also
Morocco-Netherlands relations

Notes

Moroccan translators
17th-century Moroccan writers
Year of birth unknown
Year of death unknown
17th-century Moroccan people
16th-century Moroccan people
Moroccan diplomats
People from Marrakesh
Ambassadors of Morocco to the Netherlands
17th-century diplomats